Achondrogenesis, type 2 results in short arms and legs, a small chest with short ribs, and underdeveloped lungs at birth. Achondrogenesis, type 2 is a subtype of collagenopathy, types II and XI. This condition is also associated with a lack of bone formation (ossification) in the spine and pelvis. Typical facial features include a prominent forehead, a small chin, and, in some cases, an opening in the roof of the mouth (a cleft palate). The abdomen is enlarged, and affected infants often have a condition called hydrops fetalis in which excess fluid builds up in the body before birth. The skull bones may be soft, but they often appear normal on X-ray images. In contrast, bones in the spine (vertebrae) and pelvis do not harden.

Achondrogenesis, type 2 and hypochondrogenesis (a similar skeletal disorder) together affect 1 in 40,000 to 60,000 births. Achondrogenesis, type 2 is one of several skeletal disorders caused by mutations in the COL2A1 gene. This gene provides instructions for making a protein that forms type II collagen. This type of collagen is found mostly in cartilage and in the clear gel that fills the eyeball (the vitreous). It is essential for the normal development of bones and other tissues that form the body's supportive framework (connective tissues). Mutations in the COL2A1 gene interfere with the assembly of type II collagen molecules, which prevents bones and other connective tissues from developing properly.

Achondrogenesis, type 2 is considered an autosomal dominant disorder because one copy of the altered gene in each cell is sufficient to cause the condition. The disorder is not passed on to the next generation, however, because affected individuals hardly survive past puberty.

References

This article incorporates public domain text from The U.S. National Library of Medicine

External links 

Congenital disorders
Collagen disease
Rare syndromes